Mariusz Waldemar Kieca (born 5 November 1969), is a Polish former ice hockey player. During his career he played for KTH Krynica, GKS Tychy, SMS Warszawa, GKS Katowice, and Cracovia Kraków. He also played for the Polish national team at the 1992 Winter Olympics and several World Championships.

References

External links
 

1969 births
Living people
GKS Katowice (ice hockey) players
GKS Tychy (ice hockey) players
Ice hockey players at the 1992 Winter Olympics
MKS Cracovia (ice hockey) players
KTH Krynica players
Olympic ice hockey players of Poland
People from Sosnowiec
Sportspeople from Silesian Voivodeship
Polish ice hockey goaltenders
SMS Warszawa players